Abercarn railway station served the village of Abercarn, in the county of Monmouthshire.

History
The station was opened by the Monmouthshire Railway and Canal Company on 21 December 1850. It became part of the Great Western Railway on 1 August 1880 when the Monmouthshire Railway was taken over having been leased to the Great Western from 1 August 1875. Passing on to the Western Region of British Railways on nationalisation in 1948, it was closed to passengers by the British Transport Commission on 30 April 1962, having already closed to goods traffic on 7 December 1959.

The site today
Trains on the reopened Ebbw Valley Railway pass the site between Cross Keys and Newbridge stations. There is no station at Abercarn now, although the site was one of those considered at the project's planning stage.

References

Notes

Sources

 (Map showing the location of Abercarn railway station)

External links
 Abercarn station on a navigable historical map

Disused railway stations in Caerphilly County Borough
History of Monmouthshire
Former Great Western Railway stations
Railway stations in Great Britain opened in 1850
Railway stations in Great Britain closed in 1962
1850 establishments in Wales
1962 disestablishments in Wales